Karam Ibrahim Gaber (born 1 September 1979 in Alexandria) is an Egyptian Greco-Roman wrestler. He won the gold medal in the Men's Greco-Roman 96 kg at the 2004 Summer Olympics, and won the silver medal at the 2003 World Championships. At the 2012 London Olympics, he won a silver medal. He was suspended by United World Wrestling for two years in August 2015, because of a "whereabouts failure" during his doping test.

Career
Gaber won at the 2004 Olympics Greco-Roman finals with a gap of 12 points (12–1), having competed against Ramaz Nozadze of Georgia and Mehmet Özal, beating him in the semifinals with 11 points (11–0). Gaber won the second gold medal for Egypt in Greco-Roman wrestling, the other being from the 1928 Summer Olympics.

Gaber competed in a mixed martial arts match against Kazuyuki Fujita (Greco-Roman Wrestling) at K-1's Dynamite event on December 31, 2004.

Gaber was Egypt's flagbearer at the Opening Ceremony for the 2008 Olympics in Beijing, although he failed to qualify for the quarter finals in Beijing. He won the silver medal at the 2012 Summer Olympics.

In 2015, Gaber was a favorite to win another world gold at the 2016 Olympics with long time personal coach Jakob Panotas, until Gaber was suspended by United World Wrestling for two years in August 2015 due to a "whereabouts failure" during a miss call/location for his doping test.

Mixed martial arts record

|-
| Loss
| align=center | 0–1
|  Kazuyuki Fujita
| KO (punch)
| K-1 PREMIUM 2004 Dynamite!!
| 
| align=center | 1
| align=center | 1:07
|
|

References

External links
 
 Calgary Sun's interview with Kurt Angle, where he mentions Karam Gaber
 Angle wants a gift of Gaber: Says WWE brass must hire Egyptian gold medallist

1979 births
Living people
Egyptian male sport wrestlers
Olympic wrestlers of Egypt
Wrestlers at the 2004 Summer Olympics
Wrestlers at the 2008 Summer Olympics
Wrestlers at the 2012 Summer Olympics
Olympic gold medalists for Egypt
Olympic silver medalists for Egypt
Egyptian male mixed martial artists
Light heavyweight mixed martial artists
Mixed martial artists utilizing Greco-Roman wrestling
Sportspeople from Alexandria
Olympic medalists in wrestling
Medalists at the 2012 Summer Olympics
Doping cases in wrestling
Egyptian sportspeople in doping cases
World Wrestling Championships medalists
Medalists at the 2004 Summer Olympics
Mediterranean Games gold medalists for Egypt
Competitors at the 2005 Mediterranean Games
Mediterranean Games medalists in wrestling
20th-century Egyptian people
21st-century Egyptian people